Møvik or Møvig is a neighbourhood in the city of Kristiansand in Agder county, Norway.  The neighborhood is located in the borough of Vågsbygd and in the district of Voiebyen. It's located in the southeast part of the borough along the shore. It lies north of Spinneren and Krooden, southwest of Ternevig, and south of Voie.

Møvik has the only junior high for the district of Voiebyen. The Kristiansand Cannon Museum is located in the hills south of Møvik, near the Møvik fortress.

References

Geography of Kristiansand
Neighbourhoods of Kristiansand